The 2023 SummerSlam is the upcoming 36th annual SummerSlam professional wrestling pay-per-view (PPV) and livestreaming event produced by WWE. It will be held for wrestlers from the promotion's Raw and SmackDown brand divisions. The event is scheduled to take place on Saturday, August 5, 2023, at Ford Field in Detroit, Michigan, returning the event to its traditional August slot after the previous year was held in July. This will also be the first SummerSlam to be livestreamed on Binge in Australia. This also marks WWE's first event to be held at Ford Field since WrestleMania 23 in April 2007.

Production

Background

SummerSlam is an annual professional wrestling event traditionally held in August by WWE since 1988. Dubbed "The Biggest Party of the Summer", it is one of the promotion's five biggest events of the year, along with WrestleMania, Royal Rumble, Survivor Series, and Money in the Bank, referred to as the "Big Five". Out of the five, it is considered WWE's second biggest event of the year behind WrestleMania. Announced on February 7, 2023, the 36th SummerSlam is scheduled to be held on Saturday, August 5, 2023, at Ford Field in Detroit, Michigan, returning SummerSlam to its traditional August slot after the previous year was held in July. This also marks WWE's first event to be held at Ford Field since WrestleMania 23 in April 2007. The event will feature wrestlers from the Raw and SmackDown brand divisions, and in addition to airing on pay-per-view worldwide and the livestreaming services Peacock in the United States and the WWE Network in most international markets, it will also be the first SummerSlam to livestream on Binge in Australia after the Australian version of the WWE Network merged under Foxtel's channel Binge in January.

Storylines
The event will include matches that result from scripted storylines, where wrestlers portray heroes, villains, or less distinguishable characters in scripted events that build tension and culminate in a wrestling match or series of matches. Results are predetermined by WWE's writers on the Raw and SmackDown brands, while storylines are produced on WWE's weekly television shows, Monday Night Raw and Friday Night SmackDown.

References

External links
 

2023
2023 WWE Network events
2023 WWE pay-per-view events
Professional wrestling in Michigan
Events in Detroit
Events in Michigan
 August 2023 events in the United States